Levente Gyöngyösi (born 1975, Cluj-Napoca, Romania) is a Romanian-born Hungarian composer. He moved to Hungary in 1989, when he was 14.

Works, editions and recordings
 Opera "A gólyakalifa" (The Stork Caliph) after the novel of Mihály Babits. Hungarian State Opera, May 2005.
 Assumpta est Maria for mixed choirs
 Két keserû népdal ("two bitter folksongs") for mixed choir
 Salve Regina for soprano solo, female choir and two instruments
 Vanitatum vanitas for female chorus (2001)
 Missa Lux et Origo for female choirs (2004).
 Verkündigung - symphonic cycle in five movements 2003
 oratorio Canticle of the Sun, Budapest Spring Festival 2004
 Te lucis ante terminum
 "Confitemini Domino" for female choirs
 "Dixit in corde suo" for mixed choir and drum (2012)
 Concerto for Piccolo and Orchestra. Composed for, premiered and recorded by Peter Verhoyen (2022)

 He also wrote 4 symphonies (the 3td with soprano solo is named 'Birth'; the 4th is named "Az Illés szekerén") and a Sinfonia Concertante for percussion group and orchestra.

References

Hungarian composers
Hungarian male composers
1975 births
Musicians from Cluj-Napoca
Living people